De Anza Force Soccer Club, is an association football club in Saratoga, California, with nearly 80 boys' and girls' teams from under-7 to under-18 level.

History
Founded in 1999, the De Anza Force has grown into one of the largest American soccer development clubs, with 95% of alumni going on to receive scholarships at NCAA schools. The club has produced over ten players who have gone on to represent the United States at full international level, with numerous others representing at youth level.

The club has over thirty coaches, including former United States internationals Jeff Baicher, Paul Bravo and Brandi Chastain. Former Barcelona academy director Albert Puig has served as technical director for the club.

In 2020, the club was invited to take part in the Elite Clubs National League (ECNL) at youth level, as well as the MLS Next.

Notable former players
Note: Players highlighted in bold are full internationals for the nation indicated.

Men

Women

References

Soccer clubs in the San Francisco Bay Area
Soccer academies in the United States